Law enforcement in Korea is the subject of two separate articles:
 Law enforcement in North Korea
 Law enforcement in South Korea